Colonel José Antonio Sotillo was the youngest son of Venezuelan general Juan Antonio Sotillo. In 1858, during the Federal War, he and his brother colonel Miguel Sotillo accompanied their father on a raid through the Province of Barcelona, in eastern Venezuela.

Colonel José Antonio Sotillo died during the Battle of El Lecherito, on February 2, 1860.

See also 

Juan Antonio Sotillo
José Tadeo Monagas

Venezuelan soldiers
Year of birth missing
1860 deaths